Maycee Kaye Barber (born May 18, 1998) is an American mixed martial artist. She currently competes in the Flyweight division in the Ultimate Fighting Championship (UFC). As of March 7, 2023, she is #13 in the UFC women's flyweight rankings.

Background
Barber was born in Greeley, Colorado. She began pursuing mixed martial arts (MMA) at an early age and set her eyes on becoming a professional fighter. In an interview with Yahoo Sports' Kevin Iole, Barber's father, Bucky Barber, said: "At that point, it was, 'OK, the better we make her as a fighter, the less damage she's going to take.' So we started to travel, and we took her literally all over the United States. "

Barber has a younger brother, Wyatt, who also is a mixed martial artist signed to Bellator.

Mixed martial arts career

Legacy Fighting Alliance 
Barber made her professional debut against Itzel Esquivel at LFA 14 on June 23, 2017. She won the fight by a first-round armbar submission.

Barber was booked to face Mallory Martin at LFA 22 on September 8, 2017. She won the fight by unanimous decision.

Barber faced Kaila Thompson at LFA 33 on February 18, 2018. She won the fight by a first-round submission.

Barber faced Audrey Perkins at LFA 39 on May 4, 2018, in her final fight with the promotion. She won the fight by a second-round technical knockout, the first knockout victory of her professional career.

Mayce Barber faced Jamie Colleen at Dana White's Contender Series 13 on July 17, 2018. She received a UFC contract after earning a stoppage in the third round.

Ultimate Fighting Championship
Barber made her UFC debut on November 10, 2018 on UFC Fight Night: The Korean Zombie vs. Rodríguez against Hannah Cifers. She won the fight via TKO in round two.

Barber faced JJ Aldrich at UFC Fight Night: Thompson vs. Pettis on March 23, 2019. Barber won the fight via technical knockout in round two.

Barber faced Gillian Robertson on October 18, 2019 at UFC on ESPN 6. She won the fight via technical knockout in round one.

Barber faced Roxanne Modafferi on January 18, 2020 at UFC 246. She lost the one-sided fight by unanimous decision.

After a year of hiatus recovering from a knee injury, Barber faced Alexa Grasso on February 13, 2021 at UFC 258. She lost the fight via unanimous decision.

Barber faced Miranda Maverick on July 24, 2021 at UFC on ESPN: Sandhagen vs. Dillashaw. She won the fight via controversial split decision. 22 out of 22 media outlets scored the bout as a win for Maverick.

Barber was expected to face Montana De La Rosa on December 11, 2021 at UFC 269. However, De La Rosa pulled out of the fight in early October citing injury  and she was replaced by Erin Blanchfield. In turn, Barber withdrew in early November due to undisclosed reasons.

Barber faced Montana De La Rosa on April 23, 2022 at UFC Fight Night 205. She won the fight via unanimous decision.

Barber, replacing injured Casey O'Neill, faced Jessica Eye on July 2, 2022, at UFC 276. She won the bout via unanimous decision. The bout also marked the last of her prevailing contract, and she re-signed with the UFC later in the year.

Barber is scheduled to face Andrea Lee on March 25, 2023, at UFC on ESPN 43.

Championships and accomplishments
Ultimate Fighting Championship
2nd most knockout wins in UFC Flyweight division history (two)

Mixed martial arts record

|-
|Win
|align=center|11–2
|Jessica Eye
|Decision (unanimous)
|UFC 276
| 
|align=center|3
|align=center|5:00
|Las Vegas, Nevada, United States
|
|-
|Win
|align=center|10–2
|Montana De La Rosa
|Decision (unanimous)
|UFC Fight Night: Lemos vs. Andrade
|
|align=center|3
|align=center|5:00
|Las Vegas, Nevada, United States
|
|-
|Win
|align=center|9–2
|Miranda Maverick
|Decision (split)
|UFC on ESPN: Sandhagen vs. Dillashaw
|
|align=center|3
|align=center|5:00
|Las Vegas, Nevada, United States
|
|-
|Loss
|align=center|8–2
|Alexa Grasso
|Decision (unanimous)
|UFC 258
|
|align=center|3
|align=center|5:00
|Las Vegas, Nevada, United States
|
|-
|Loss
|align=center|8–1
|Roxanne Modafferi
|Decision (unanimous)
|UFC 246
|
|align=center|3
|align=center|5:00
|Las Vegas, Nevada, United States
|
|-
|Win
|align=center|8–0
|Gillian Robertson
|TKO (punches)
|UFC on ESPN: Reyes vs. Weidman
|
|align=center|1
|align=center|3:04
|Boston, Massachusetts, United States
|
|-
|Win
|align=center|7–0
|JJ Aldrich
|TKO (knees and punches)
|UFC Fight Night: Thompson vs. Pettis
|
|align=center|2
|align=center|3:01
|Nashville, Tennessee, United States
|
|-
|Win
|align=center|6–0
||Hannah Cifers
|TKO (elbows and punches)
|UFC Fight Night: The Korean Zombie vs. Rodríguez
|
|align=center|2
|align=center|2:01
|Denver, Colorado, United States
|
|-
|Win
|align=center|5–0
|Jamie Colleen
|TKO (elbows)
|Dana White's Contender Series 13
|
|align=center|3
|align=center|4:15
|Las Vegas, Nevada, United States
|
|-
|Win
|align=center|4–0
|Audrey Perkins
|TKO (punches and elbows)
|LFA 39
|
|align=center|2
|align=center|2:54
|Vail, Colorado, United States
|
|-
|Win
|align=center|3–0
|Kaila Thompson
|Submission (rear-naked choke)
|LFA 33
|
|align=center|1
|align=center|0:31
|Dallas, Texas, United States
|
|-
|Win
|align=center|2–0
|Mallory Martin
||Decision (unanimous)
|LFA 22
|
|align=center|3
|align=center|5:00
|Broomfield, Colorado, United States
|
|-
|Win
|align=center|1–0
|Itzel Esquivel
|Submission (armbar)
|LFA 14
|
|align=center|1
|align=center|3:52
|Houston, Texas, United States
|
|-

See also
List of current UFC fighters
List of female mixed martial artists

References

External links
 
 

1998 births
Living people
American female mixed martial artists
Flyweight mixed martial artists
Strawweight mixed martial artists
Mixed martial artists utilizing karate
Mixed martial artists utilizing Brazilian jiu-jitsu
Mixed martial artists from Colorado
Ultimate Fighting Championship female fighters
American female karateka
American practitioners of Brazilian jiu-jitsu
Female Brazilian jiu-jitsu practitioners
People from Greeley, Colorado